Richard John Luman (April 26, 1900 – April 26, 1973) was an American football and basketball player.  He played college football for Yale University and was a consensus selection at the end position on the 1924 College Football All-America Team.

Luman was raised in Pinedale, Wyoming, and attended preparatory school at Phillips Exeter Academy.  He attended college at Yale University, where he was a member of the football and basketball teams.  As an end for the Yale Bulldogs football team, he was a consensus first-team All-American.  In basketball, he played at the center position and was selected as the captain of the 1924–25 Yale basketball team.

He died in 1973 and was buried at the Mount Olivet Cemetery in Cheyenne, Wyoming.

References

1900 births
1973 deaths
American football ends
Centers (basketball)
Yale Bulldogs football players
Yale Bulldogs men's basketball players
All-American college football players
Players of American football from Wyoming
Basketball players from Wyoming
People from Pinedale, Wyoming
American men's basketball players